Girod is an Ortsgemeinde – a community belonging to a Verbandsgemeinde – in the Westerwaldkreis in Rhineland-Palatinate, Germany.

Geography

Location
The community lies in the Westerwald between Koblenz and Gießen on the Eisenbach and on the edge of the Nassau Nature Park. It belongs to the Verbandsgemeinde of Montabaur, a kind of collective municipality.

Constituent communities
Girod has one outlying Ortsteil named Kleinholbach. The two once autonomous villages are separated by the A 3.

History
In 1235, Girod had its first documentary mention.

Politics

The municipal council is made up of 16 council members who were elected in a majority vote in a municipal election on 7 June 2009.

Economy and infrastructure

Transport
Girod has a request stop on the Lower Westerwald Railway (Unterwesterwaldbahn), Siershahn–Montabaur–Limburg, at which stop regional trains roughly every two hours, run by the Vectus Verkehrsgesellschaft. The nearest Autobahn interchanges are Montabaur and Diez on the A 3 (Cologne–Frankfurt), each 5 km away.

References

External links
 Girod in the collective municipality’s Web pages 

Municipalities in Rhineland-Palatinate
Westerwaldkreis